The Goa Foundation is an Indian environmental action group. One of the best known in Goa, it was founded in 1986 by a group of Goan environmentalists each fighting individual environmental battles, the organisation today holds influence with the judiciary, government and the general public, having persisted with its environmental agenda for nearly two decades.

The work of the Foundation spans different areas and fields, all related in some way or another with the conservation of the Goan environment:

Environmental litigation: The Foundation has filed and fought more than 80 Public Interest Litigations in the High Court and the Supreme Court of India on environmental issues. These petitions deal with mining, forests, beaches, pollution from industry, town planning, etc.
Environment Education: The organization has remained at the forefront of environmental education efforts with its flagship volume, Fish Curry and Rice, a periodically updated citizens' environment report. From time to time, the organization holds public interest law courses for the general public, with a strong emphasis on environmental concerns.
Management of Solid Wastes: The Foundation continues to work on specific environmental problems facing the state of Goa including the management and handling of solid wastes; for these projects, it has been supported by the Goa government and the UNDP Small Grants Project. Its most recent project in this direction is the removal of plastic litter from the Goan environment.
Statutory Responsibilities: The Foundation has been nominated to the Goa State Coastal Zone Management Authority and to the Supreme Court Monitoring Committee on Hazardous Wastes (which is an all-India responsibility).

The Foundation has assisted in the formation of a non-profit company called Green Goa Works, chaired by Wendel Rodricks, Goa's internationally known fashion designer. The company has been registered under Section 25 of the Company's Act. It deals only with environmental rehabilitation projects especially those relating to environmentally friendly means of disposing of solid wastes.

The National Green Tribunal (NGT) has given clearance to the application given by the Goa Foundation for the construction of the Tiracol bridge. the Tribunal pointed out that the construction will be monitored by state agencies for the safekeeping of the set environmental guidelines.

References

External links
 The Goa Foundation

Environmental organisations based in India
Organisations based in Goa
Organizations established in 1986
1986 establishments in Goa, Daman and Diu